Matthew William Parkinson (born 24 October 1996) is an English cricketer who plays for Lancashire. He made his international debut for the England cricket team in November 2019. Parkinson made his Test debut for England in June 2022, as a concussion substitute. His twin brother, Callum, plays cricket for Leicestershire.

Domestic career
A leg-spin bowler, Parkinson made his first-class debut on 20 June 2016 for Lancashire against Warwickshire in the 2016 County Championship, taking 5 for 49 in the first innings. He made his Twenty20 debut for Lancashire in the 2017 NatWest t20 Blast on 16 July 2017.

In January 2022, Parkinson signed a contract extension to keep him at Lancashire until the end of the 2023 season. In April 2022, he was bought by the Manchester Originals for the 2022 season of The Hundred.

International career
He toured the West Indies with the England Lions in 2017-18, taking 4 for 26 in the final 50-over match against West Indies A and winning the player of the match award.

In September 2019, Parkinson was named in England's Test and Twenty20 International (T20I) squads for their series against New Zealand. He made his T20I debut for England, against New Zealand, on 5 November 2019. The following month, Parkinson was named in England's One Day International (ODI) squad for their series against South Africa. He made his ODI debut on 4 February 2020, for England against South Africa. Later the same month, Parkinson was also named in England's Test squad for their series against Sri Lanka.

On 29 May 2020, Parkinson was named in a 55-man group of players to begin training ahead of international fixtures starting in England following the COVID-19 pandemic. On 17 June 2020, Parkinson was included in England's 30-man squad to start training behind closed doors for the Test series against the West Indies. On 9 July 2020, Parkinson was also included in England's 24-man squad to start training behind closed doors for the ODI series against Ireland. However, on 21 July 2020 in the first intra-squad practice match, Parkinson suffered an ankle injury, and was ruled out of the ODI series.

In December 2020, Parkinson was named as one of seven reserve players in England's Test squad for their series against Sri Lanka. In January 2021, he was also named as a reserve player in England's Test squad for their series against India. In February 2022, Parkinson was again named in England's Test squad, this time for their series against the West Indies.

In the final ODI of the 2021 Pakistan Tour of England, Parkinson bowled Imam-ul-Haq, placing the ball in the rough, and generating a large amount of turn. The ball was stated to be the 'biggest spinning ball in the history of ODI cricket', as the ball spin 12.1 degrees.

Parkinson made his Test debut on 2 June 2022, for England against New Zealand, as a concussion substitute replacing Jack Leach.

References

External links
 

1996 births
Living people
English cricketers
England Test cricketers
England One Day International cricketers
England Twenty20 International cricketers
Lancashire cricketers
People educated at Bolton School
North v South cricketers
Cricketers from Bolton
Staffordshire cricketers
Twin sportspeople
English twins
Manchester Originals cricketers